Ballycastle Castle was a castle located at Ballycastle in County Antrim in Northern Ireland.

History
The castle existed during the time of John Mór Tanister and was rebuilt by Sorley Boy MacDonnell in 1564. In 1565, the castle was occupied by Shane O'Neill. The castle was removed by Sir Randal MacDonnell, 1st Earl of Antrim in the 17th century. Another castle was erected in 1625 by Sir Randal McDonnell, Earl of Antrim.

During the Irish Confederate Wars, the castle was seized by Scottish troops in 1642 and later occupied by Cromwellian forces. The castle was returned to Alexander MacDonnell, 3rd Earl of Antrim in 1665. However, the castle fell into ruins and was removed in 1856 by Charles Kirkpatrick, of Whitehall.

References
Sketches of olden days in Northern Ireland by Rev. Canon Forde

Castles in County Antrim
Ruined castles in Northern Ireland